Choeroichthys brachysoma (short-bodied pipefish or Pacific short-bodied pipefish) is a species of marine fish of the family Syngnathidae.

Overview
It is found in the Indo-Pacific, from the Red Sea and East Africa to the Society Islands, the Philippines, Guam, and northern Australia. C. brachysoma shows sexual dimorphism, the females are slender with two rows of black spots along their flanks, while the males have a shorter, wider body marked with scattered, small white spots. This species is ovoviviparous, with males carrying eggs in a brood pouch until giving birth to live young.

References

Further reading

Australian Government Department of the Environment and Energy
Fishes of Australia
Wildscreen Arkive

brachysoma
Marine fish
Fish described in 1855